Mirco Gasparetto (born 2 February 1980) is an Italian footballer who played as a forward.

Gasparetto has played over 100 matches in Serie B. Although contracted for by then Serie A clubs Empoli, Genoa and Chievo, he played very few match in the Italian top division.

Football career

Early career
Born in Asolo, Veneto, Gasparetto started his career at A.C. Milan, club giant of Lombardy. In 1999–2000 season, he left for Serie C2 club Padova on loan, stayed for 2 seasons. He then left for Varese of Serie C1. In 2002, he was signed by Prato in co-ownership deal for a peppercorn fee. He scored a career high of 20 goals, and secured a move to Serie A club Empoli.

Empoli
Although Gasparetto failed to play as the regular starter, Empoli bought all remain registration rights from Milan in June 2005. After just played 6 times in 2005–06 season, he left for Mantova on loan with option to purchase. In the next season, he left for Genoa on loan for €75,000 with option to purchase, while he scored 6 goals, behind Adaílton (11 goals) Marco Di Vaio (9 goals) and the same as Giuseppe Greco.

Chievo
Genoa choose to purchase Gasparetto at the end of season, for €500,000 in co-ownership deal. He played the opening match for Genoa, but on 31 August 2007, he was transferred to Chievo of Serie B re-joining Greco. Gasparetto was valued €1.8 million, while €900,000 of them was received by Empoli.

After Chievo promoted to Serie A, he was sent back to Serie B for Pisa. In January 2010, he was loaned to Padova of Serie B after not played in the first half of 2009–10 season. In January 2011 he was signed by Cremonese.

Lumezzane
In summer 2011 Gasparetto was signed by Lumezzane for free.

amateur career

Footnotes

References

External links
  icon}} 
Schede analitiche giocatori AIC – a cura di Football.it
Gazzetta.it

1980 births
Living people
People from Asolo
Italian footballers
Italy youth international footballers
A.C. Milan players
Calcio Padova players
S.S.D. Varese Calcio players
A.C. Prato players
Empoli F.C. players
Mantova 1911 players
Genoa C.F.C. players
A.C. ChievoVerona players
Pisa S.C. players
U.S. Cremonese players
F.C. Lumezzane V.G.Z. A.S.D. players
Real Vicenza V.S. players
Serie A players
Serie B players
Serie C players
Serie D players
Association football forwards
Sportspeople from the Province of Treviso
Footballers from Veneto